The National Dance Awards 2001, were organised and presented by The Critics' Circle, and were awarded to recognise excellence in professional dance in the United Kingdom.  The ceremony was held at the Royal Opera House, London, on 12 January 2002, with awards given for productions staged in the previous year.

Awards Presented
De Valois Award for Outstanding Achievement in Dance - Anthony Dowell, formerly Artistic Director, Royal Ballet
Best Male Dancer - Johan Kobborg
Best Female Dancer - Tamara Rojo
Outstanding Young Male Artist - Edward Watson
Outstanding Young Female Artist - Erina Takahashi
Best Foreign Dance Company - Kirov Ballet from Russia
Best Choreography - Christopher Wheeldon for Polyphonia

References

National Dance Awards
Dance
Dance